PBC may refer to:

Organisations

General terms
 Public-benefit corporation (disambiguation)
 Prescribed Body Corporate, or Registered Native Title Body Corporate, a type of legal entity in Australia

Broadcasting
 Pakistan Broadcasting Corporation
 Palawan Broadcasting Corporation, Philippines
 Palestinian Broadcasting Corporation
 Persian Broadcasting Company
 Progressive Broadcasting Corporation, Philippines

Sports
 Premier Boxing Champions, televised boxing event
 Peach Belt Conference, US sports conference

Other
 Pakistan Bar Council
 Pakistan Business Council
 Parole Board of Canada
 Party of Bible-abiding Christians (Partei Bibeltreuer Christen), Germany
 Peacebuilding Commission, United Nations body
 People's Bank of China
 Pittsburgh Brewing Company

Places
 Hermanos Serdán International Airport, Puebla, Mexico by IATA airport code
 Palm Beach County, Florida.

Schools 

 Palm Beach Currumbin State High School, Queensland, Australia
 Portland Bible College, Oregon, United States
 Presentation Brothers College, Cork

Science and technology
 Periodic boundary conditions
 Primary biliary cholangitis or primary biliary cirrhosis
 .pbc, filetype of Parrot bytecode in Parrot virtual machine

Other uses
 Peru-Bolivian Confederation a short-lived post-spanish federal state
 Performance-based contracting
 Practice-based commissioning
 Process-based costing
 President Bill Clinton